Christian adult contemporary, also known as Christian AC or CAC, is a radio format. In the United States, Christian adult contemporary radio stations cater to a mostly adult audience and are similar to mainstream adult contemporary stations in that they play hits often and for long periods of time. A Christian AC station may play contemporary Christian music, but it usually excludes Christian hip hop and some forms of Christian dance-pop and teen pop, as these are less popular among adults, the target demographic.

Demographics
The target audience of Christian adult contemporary radio, generally females in their thirties or forties, has been nicknamed "Becky" by the Christian music industry. However, artists that are played on Christian adult contemporary radio are predominantly male. Male Christian artists outnumber female Christian artists by at least a 2:1 ratio and, according to Billboard, 43 of the top 50 Christian songs of the 2000s were performed by males. Females held the top spot on the Christian Songs chart for just 11 weeks out of the chart's 337 weeks of activity during the 2000s. Audience testing has revealed that men test well to audiences, while women test low to audiences. This discrepancy has been associated with an overall shift in 2003 from a mainly pop sound to a more rock-oriented sound. As the genre shifted towards more rock-driven songs, deeper male voices from artists such as Third Day, Jeremy Camp, and Todd Agnew became popular, and established female artists like Amy Grant or bands with females like Point of Grace and Avalon, who tested extremely well among audiences, went out of style, along with their pop-oriented sound. Another reason for this discrepancy is audience concern of sexuality among female artists, especially worship leaders, and possible jealousy towards female artists among the format's generally female listener base. Opinion is split on whether or not this represents a permanent shift or just a temporary trend.

See also
Contemporary Christian music
Christian contemporary hit radio

References

Radio formats
Contemporary Christian music